"Queen's Music" is part of the Faculty of Arts and Sciences at Queen's University at Kingston, in Kingston, Ontario, Canada. The School of Music is housed on the main campus of the University within Harrison-LeCaine Hall on Bader Lane, named after Frank Ll. Harrison, the first professor of music at Queen's, and Hugh LeCaine, composer and electronic instrument builder.

Founded in 1969 as the Department of Music, students at the School can enroll in the Bachelor of Music (B. Mus) program, Bachelor of Arts (Music) program, or the Concurrent Education (Music) program.

The current director of the School is Craig Walker. Past directors have included John Burge, István Anhalt, Ireneus Zuk, Alfred Fisher, Gordon E. Smith, and Margaret Walker.

References

External links
School of Music

School of Music